Metabolic myopathies are myopathies that result from defects in biochemical metabolism that primarily affect muscle. They are generally genetic defects that interfere with muscle's ability to create energy. At the cellular level, metabolic myopathies lack some kind of enzyme that prevent the chemical reactions necessary to create adenosine triphosphate (ATP). ATP is often referred to as the "molecular unit of currency" of intracellular energy transfer. The lack of ATP prevents the muscle cells from being able to function properly. Some people with a metabolic myopathy never develop symptoms due to the body's ability to produce enough ATP through alternative pathways. 

ATP → ADP + Pi + energy → muscle contraction

ATP is needed for muscle contraction by two processes:  

 Firstly, ATP is needed for transport proteins to actively transport calcium ions into the sarcoplasmic reticulum (SR) of the muscle cell between muscle contractions. When a nerve signal is received, calcium channels in the SR open briefly and calcium rushes into the cytosol by selective diffusion (which does not use ATP). The diffusion of calcium ions into the cytosol causes the myosin strands of the myofibril to become exposed, and the myosin strands pull the actin microfilaments together. The muscle begins to contract. 
 Secondly, ATP is needed to allow the myosin to release and pull again, so that the muscle can contract further in what is known as the sliding filament model.

ATP is consumed at a high rate by contracting muscles. The need for ATP in muscle cells is illustrated by the phenomenon of Rigor mortis, which is the muscle rigidity that occurs in dead bodies for a short time after death. In these muscles, all the ATP has been converted to ADP, and in the absence of further ATP being generated, the calcium transport proteins stop pumping calcium ions into the sarcoplasmic reticulum and the calcium ions gradually leak out. This causes the myosin proteins to grab the actin and pull once but without further supply of ATP, cannot release and pull again. The muscles therefore remain rigid in the position at death until the binding of myosin to actin begins to break down and they become loose again.

Symptoms 
In the event more ATP is needed from the affected pathway, the lack of it becomes an issue and symptoms develop. People with a metabolic myopathy often experience symptoms such as:

 exercise intolerance,
 muscle fatigue, pain and cramping during and/or after exercise,
 shortness of breath (dyspnea) or rapid breathing (tachypnea),
 inappropriate rapid heart rate in response to exercise (tachycardia),
 exaggerated cardiorespiratory (breath and heart rate combined) response to exercise (dyspnea/tachypnea and tachycardia),
 myogenic hyperuricemia (exercise-induced accelerated breakdown of purine nucleotides in muscle via Purine Nucleotide Cycle),
 muscle contracture (like a really bad cramp that can last for hours, which is myogenic and EMG silent),
 progressive muscle weakness,
 myoglobinuria and considerable breakdown of muscle tissue (rhabdomyolysis). 

The degree of symptoms varies greatly from person to person and is dependent on the severity of enzymatic defect. In extreme cases it can lead to Rhabdomyolysis. The symptoms experienced also depend on which metabolic pathway is impaired, as different metabolic pathways produce ATP at different time periods during activity and rest, as well as the type of activity (anerobic or aerobic) and its intensity (level of ATP consumption).

Types 

Metabolic myopathies are generally caused by an inherited genetic mutation, an inborn error of metabolism. (In livestock, acquired GSD is caused by intoxication with the alkaloid castanospermine.) Metabolic myopathies cause the underproduction of adenosine triphosphate (ATP) within the muscle cell. The genetic mutation typically has an autosomal recessive inheritance pattern making it fairly rare to inherit, but it can also be caused by a random genetic mutation. Metabolic myopathies are categorized by the metabolic pathway to which the deficient enzyme belongs. The main categories of metabolic myopathies are listed below:
 Muscle Glycogen Storage Diseases (Muscle GSDs) and other Inborn Errors of Carbohydrate Metabolism that affect muscle—defect in sugar (carbohydrate) metabolism. The deficient enzyme occurs in the cytosol of the muscle cell. 
 Lipid storage disorder—defect in fat (lipid) metabolism. The deficient enzyme occurs in the cytosol of the muscle cell.
 Nucleotide Metabolism disorder—defect in Purine Nucleotide Cycle enzyme (such as AMP deaminase deficiency). Purine nucleotide metabolism is a part of protein catabolism, and the Purine Nucleotide Cycle occurs within the cytosol of the muscle cell.
 Mitochondrial myopathy—defect in mitochondrial enzymes for oxidative phosphorylation (including Citric Acid Cycle and Electron Transport Chain). Occurs in the mitochondrion of the muscle cell.

Diagnosis 
The symptoms of a metabolic myopathy can be easily confused with the symptoms of another disease. As genetic sequencing research progresses, a non-invasive neuromuscular panel DNA test can help make a diagnosis. If the DNA test is inconclusive (negative or VUS), then a muscle biopsy is necessary for an accurate diagnosis. 

A blood test for creatine kinase (CK) can be done under normal circumstances to test for signs of tissue breakdown, or with an added cardio portion that can indicate if muscle breakdown is occurring. An electromyography (EMG) is sometimes taken in order to rule out other disorders if the cause of fatigue is unknown. An Exercise Stress Test can be used to determine an inappropriate rapid heart rate (sinus tachycardia) response to exercise, which is seen in GSD-V, other glycogenoses, and mitochondrial myopathies. A 12 Minutes Walk Test (12MWT) can also be used to determine "Second Wind" which is also seen in McArdle Disease (GSD-V). 

A cardiopulmonary exercise test can measure both heart rate and breathing, to evaluate the oxygen cost (∆V’O2/∆Work-Rate) during incremental exercise. In both glycogenoses and mitochondrial myopathies, patients displayed an increased oxygen cost during exercise compared to control subjects; and therefore, can perform less work for a given VO2 consumption during submaximal daily life exercises.

Differentiating between different types of metabolic myopathies can be difficult due to the similar symptoms of each type such as myoglobinuria and exercise intolerance. It has to be determined whether the patient has fixed or exercise-induced manifestations; and if exercise-related, what kind of exercise, before extensive exercise-related lab testing is done to determine the underlying cause. 

Adequate knowledge is required of the body's bioenergetic systems, including:

 which circumstances constitute anaerobic exercise (blood flow restricted by contracted muscles, insufficient oxygen and blood borne fuels, particularly isometric exercise, as well as sudden increased intensity) versus aerobic exercise (blood flow unrestricted), 
 anaerobic metabolism (Phosphagen System and anaerobic glycolysis - ATP produced without oxygen, regardless of adequate blood flow or not, quickly produces ATP which is useful in high-intensity activity and the beginning of any activity) versus aerobic metabolism (oxidative phosphorylation - ATP produced with oxygen, adequate blood flow required, slow to produce ATP but produces for longer and high yield),
 the different sources of energy (phosphagen system, carbohydrate metabolism, lipid metabolism [including ketosis], protein metabolism [including the Purine Nucleotide Cycle], oxidative phosphorylation), 
 how long does each source take to start producing energy, 
 how long does each source continue to produce energy,
 how long does each source take to replenish,
 how much ATP can each source generate,
 and which fuel source is primarily used given the intensity of the activity. 

For example, leisurely-paced walking and fast-paced walking on level ground (no incline) are both aerobic, but fast-paced walking relies on more muscle glycogen because of the higher intensity (which would cause exercise intolerance symptoms in those with muscle glycogenoses that hadn't yet achieved "Second Wind"). When walking at a leisurely pace on level ground (no incline), but there is loose gravel or sand, long grass, snow, or walking into a headwind, that added resistance (requiring the muscles to tense more) makes the activity more reliant on muscle glycogen also.

Those with muscle glycogenoses can maintain a healthy life of exercise by learning activity adaptations, utilizing the bioenergetic systems that are available to them. Depending on the type of activity and whether they are in second wind, they slow their pace or rest briefly when need be, to make sure not to empty their "ATP Reservoir."

Treatment 
Metabolic Myopathies have varying levels of symptoms, being most severe when developed during infancy. Those who do not develop a form of a metabolic myopathy until they are in their young adult or adult life tend to have more treatable symptoms that can be helped with a change in diet and exercise. 

Depending on what enzyme is affected, a high-protein or low-fat diet may be recommended along with mild exercise. It is important for people with metabolic myopathies to consult with their doctors for a treatment plan in order to prevent acute muscle breakdowns while exercising that lead to the release of muscle proteins into the bloodstream that can cause kidney damage. 

A ketogenic diet has a remarkable effect on CNS-symptoms in PDH-deficiency and has also been tried in complex I deficiency. A ketogenic diet has demonstrated beneficial for McArdle Disease (GSD-V) as ketones readily convert to Acetyl CoA for oxidative phosphorylation, whereas Free Fatty Acids take a few minutes to convert into Acetyl CoA. As of 2022, another study on a ketogenic diet and McArdle Disease (GSD-V) is underway.

References

External links 
 Metabolic Myopathies - eMedicine
 IAMGSD (International Association for Muscle Glycogen Storage Disease)
 Walking With McArdle's - IAMGSD videos
 EUROMAC Introduction - Video about McArdle Disease and the EUROMAC Registry of McArdle Disease and other rare glycogenoses patients

Muscular disorders
Metabolic disorders